Embassy of Ukraine in Latvia is the diplomatic mission of Ukraine in Riga, Latvia. Since February 27, 2019, Ambassador Extraordinary and Plenipotentiary of Ukraine to the Republic of Latvia is Olexandr Mischenko.

History of the diplomatic relations

On August 26, 1991, Ukraine recognized independence of the Republic of Latvia. On December 4, 1991, Latvia recognized independence of Ukraine. Diplomatic relations between two countries were established on February 12, 1992. The Embassy of Ukraine has been functioning in Riga since 1993. The inauguration of the Embassy took place in 1995, in the presence of the President of Ukraine Leonid Kuchma and the President of Latvia Guntis Ulmanis.

See also
 Latvia–Ukraine relations
 List of diplomatic missions in Latvia
 Foreign relations of Latvia
 Foreign relations of Ukraine

External links

References

Latvia–Ukraine relations
Riga
Ukraine
Buildings and structures in Riga